Robert Poley or Pooley (c. 1600–1627), of Boxted, Suffolk, was an English Member of Parliament.

He was a Member (MP) of the Parliament of England for Queenborough in 1624 and 1626.

References

1600s births
1627 deaths
English MPs 1624–1625
Politicians from Suffolk
English MPs 1626